Matti Paasivuori  (6 May 1866, Ilmajoki - 16 June 1937 in Helsinki) was a Finnish politician from the Social Democratic Party. Paasivuori was the Chairman of the Social Democratic Party on three occasions: 1909–1911, 1913–1917 and 1926–1930.

Paasivuori worked as a carpenter and participated early in the labor movement. He was a pioneer in the labor movement as a leader of the Finnish Trade Union Federation and affected its ideological and political development. Since 1907 he was Member of the Finnish Parliament (Eduskunta) and participated in the development of occupational safety legislation. He was moderate in his political orientation and gained respect in both ends of the political spectrum. In 1917 he was Deputy Head of Trade and Industry in Oskari Tokoi's Senate, which was the first government in the world led by a Social Democrat. Paasivuori did not take part in the Finnish Civil War of 1918 and after the defeat of the red troops he was for a half year the only representative from the political left who was allowed to participate in the parliament. Paasivuori was the minister of social affairs in the minority government of Väinö Tanner from 1926 to 1927.

Paasivuori is buried in the Hietaniemi Cemetery in Helsinki. Paasivuorenkatu Street in central Helsinki (in Hakaniemi) is named after him.

References

1866 births
1937 deaths
People from Ilmajoki
People from Vaasa Province (Grand Duchy of Finland)
Leaders of the Social Democratic Party of Finland
Finnish senators
Ministers of Social Affairs of Finland
Members of the Parliament of Finland (1907–08)
Members of the Parliament of Finland (1908–09)
Members of the Parliament of Finland (1909–10)
Members of the Parliament of Finland (1910–11)
Members of the Parliament of Finland (1911–13)
Members of the Parliament of Finland (1913–16)
Members of the Parliament of Finland (1916–17)
Members of the Parliament of Finland (1917–19)
Members of the Parliament of Finland (1919–22)
Members of the Parliament of Finland (1922–24)
Members of the Parliament of Finland (1924–27)
Members of the Parliament of Finland (1927–29)
Members of the Parliament of Finland (1929–30)
Members of the Parliament of Finland (1930–33)
Members of the Parliament of Finland (1933–36)
Finnish trade union leaders
Burials at Hietaniemi Cemetery